Joanna Michelle Jordan (born 25 April 1969)  is a cricketer who played for the England women's cricket team in 9 Test matches and 39 One Day Internationals from 1987 to 1995. She played domestic cricket for East Midlands.

She scored a total of 197 runs in Tests matches, averaging 17.90 with a best of 59 against Australia. She took 28 wickets at an average of 24.75 with a best analysis of 5 for 26 against New Zealand.

She made 422 runs in One Day International cricket at an average of 20.09, with the highlight an unbeaten 47 against New Zealand. She took 49 wickets at an average of 16.42 with an economy rate of 2.50 per over. Her best spell was a devastating 7 for 8 against Denmark. She helped England win the World Cup in 1993, scoring 38 and taking a wicket in the victory over New Zealand in the final at Lord's.

Her son, Scott, died of cot death in February 2000, which lead to her becoming a fundraiser for The Cot Death Society.

References

External links
 

1969 births
Living people
Cricketers from Leicester
England women Test cricketers
England women One Day International cricketers
East Midlands women cricketers